Mioara Mandea is Programme Manager for the Solid Earth Observation at the Centre National d'Etudes Spatiales. She won the 2018 European Geosciences Union Petrus Peregrinus Medal and has previously served as their General Secretary. She is best known for her work on geomagnetic jerks, sub-decadal changes in the Earth's magnetic field.

Early life and education 
Mandea was born in Romania. She started her scientific career in the Socialist Republic of Romania. She eventually studied engineering and geophysics at the University of Bucharest and graduated in 1993. She moved to the Institut de Physique du Globe de Paris for her doctoral degree, completed her PhD in 1996. In 1994 she was made the Head of the French National Magnetic Observatory, and remained in this role until 2004. She earned an additional Habilitation à Diriger des Recherches at the University Paris VII in 2011.

Research and career 
Mandea leads the collection and analysis of geomagnetic data. She was the first to recognise the sub-decadal fluctuations in the Earth's magnetic field known as geomagnetic jerks. Mandea has designed new data acquisition and analytical platforms to understand geomagnetic data. She pioneered the use of virtual observatories, and contributed significantly to the World Digital Magnetic Anomaly Map. She has explored the use of gravity data from satellites to understand the core–mantle boundary. She proposed that the gravimetric and magnetic signals at the Earth’s surface can be described by mass redistribution at the core–mantle boundary and secondary flow in the outer core.

Academic service 
In 2005 Mandea was made Head of the Geomagnetic section at the Helmholtz-Zentrum Dresden-Rossendorf, where she expanded new geomagnetic observatories. Mandea was made President of the European Geosciences Union Division Earth Magnetism and Rock physics in 2007. She moved to the Institut de Physique du Globe de Paris in 2009, and was made deputy director of the Versailles Saint-Quentin-en-Yvelines University in 2011. Mandea was appointed Director for Strategy and Programmes and leader of the Solid Earth programmes at the Centre National d'Etudes Spatiales in 2011. In 2012 Mandea was made the General Secretary of the European Geosciences Union. She also serves as the French delegate for the Commission for the Geological Map of the World. Mandea is secretary general of the International Association of Geomagnetism and Aeronomy.

Awards and honours 

 1997 French Geological Society Van Straelen prize
 1998 Romanian Academy Hepites prize 
 2000 Medal of the Slovak Academy of Sciences
 2008 Academy of Romanian Scientists Titular Member
 2010 American Geophysical Union Excellence in Geophysical Education Award Committee
 2014 American Geophysical Union International Award
 2015 Member of the Academia Europaea
 2016 National Order of Merit
 2018 Petrus Peregrinus Medal

References 

Living people
Romanian women scientists
Scientists from Bucharest
University of Bucharest alumni
CNES
Chevaliers of the Légion d'honneur
Foreign Members of the Russian Academy of Sciences
Year of birth missing (living people)